The Russian civilization (Русская цивилизация) is a purported civilization formed by Russians governed by the claimed "Russian world", used as a concept in Russian nationalism and Russian irredentism.

Definition 
The concept takes on a different meaning depending on the author:
 according to Philip Bagby, it is one of the peripheral civilizations.
 others, such as professor Vladimir Nikolayevich Leksin, consider it a myth.
 According to Samuel Huntington, there is no such thing as a Russian civilization. In his view, Russian culture is a part of an Eastern Orthodox civilization.
 Toynbee regarded the Russian civilization as having modest cultural achievements, but as something complete, Danilevsky and Spengler described it more as a phenomenon of the future, the latter believed that government reform of Peter the Great did not meet the traditions of a Russian civilization.
 Plekhanov and Berdyaev believed that a Russian civilization occupies a border position between East and West. Solovyov believed that the mission of a Russian civilization in the unification of East and West, and the Eurasianists consider it as some third force.
 Some consider communism alien to traditional Russian values, others believe that the USSR was an incarnation of a traditional Russian civilization. Orthodoxy, Autocracy, and Nationality is similar to communist partijnost (party-mindedness, partisanship), idejnost (ideology-mindedness) and populism.
 Researcher Rumyana Cholakova (Washington University in St. Louis) considers Russian civilization to be amalgamation of Slavic culture, Tatar culture, Finno-Ugric culture, Viking culture and the Great Steppe culture of its inhabitants. According to her, the concept of Russian soul is central to Russian civilization.

See also
 Russian world
 All-Russian nation
 Culture of Russia
 Culture of the Soviet Union
 Russian irredentism
 Russian nationalism
 Russian soul
 Russification

References

Sources 
 

European civilizations
Modern civilizations
Russian philosophy